Francoist Spain, or the Francoist dictatorship, was the period of Spanish history between 1939 and 1975, when Francisco Franco ruled Spain after the Spanish Civil War with the title . After his death in 1975, Spain transitioned into a democracy. During this time period, Spain was officially known as the Spanish State.

The nature of the regime evolved and changed during its existence. Months after the start of the Spanish Civil War in July 1936, Franco emerged as the dominant rebel military leader and was proclaimed head of state on 1 October 1936, ruling a dictatorship over the territory controlled by the Nationalist faction. The 1937 Unification Decree, which merged all parties supporting the rebel side, led to Nationalist Spain becoming a single-party regime under the FET y de las JONS. The end of the war in 1939 brought the extension of the Franco rule to the whole country and the exile of Republican institutions. The Francoist dictatorship originally took a form described as "fascistized dictatorship", or "semi-fascist regime", showing clear influence of fascism in fields such as labor relations, the autarkic economic policy, aesthetics, and the single-party system. As time went on, the regime opened up and became closer to developmental dictatorships, although it always preserved residual fascist trappings.

During the Second World War, war-ravaged and starving Spain did not join the Axis powers (its supporters from the civil war, Italy and Germany), but supported them in various ways throughout most of the war while maintaining its neutrality as an official policy of "non-belligerence". Because of this, Spain was isolated by many other countries for nearly a decade after World War II, while its autarkic economy, still trying to recover from the civil war, suffered from chronic depression. The 1947 Law of Succession made Spain a de jure kingdom again, but defined Franco as the head of state for life with the power to choose the person to become King of Spain and his successor.

Reforms were implemented in the 1950s and Spain abandoned autarky, reassigning economic authority from the Falangist movement, which had been prone to isolationism, to a new breed of economists, the technocrats of Opus Dei. This led to massive economic growth, second only to Japan, that lasted until the mid-1970s, known as the "Spanish miracle". During the 1950s the regime also changed from being openly totalitarian and using severe repression to an authoritarian system with limited pluralism. As a result of these reforms, Spain was allowed to join the United Nations in 1955, and during the Cold War Franco was one of Europe's foremost anti-communist figures: his regime was assisted by Western powers, particularly the United States. Franco died in 1975 at the age of 82. He restored the monarchy before his death and made his successor King Juan Carlos I, who would lead the Spanish transition to democracy.

Overview 

On 1 October 1936, Franco was formally recognised as Caudillo of Spain—the Spanish equivalent of the Italian Duce and the German Führer—by the Junta de Defensa Nacional (National Defense Junta), which governed the territories occupied by the Nationalists. In April 1937, Franco assumed control of the Falange Española de las JONS, then led by Manuel Hedilla, who had succeeded José Antonio Primo de Rivera, who was executed in November 1936 by the Republican government. He merged it with the Carlist Comunión Tradicionalista to form the Falange Española Tradicionalista y de las JONS. The sole legal party of Francoist Spain, it was the main component of the Movimiento Nacional (National Movement). The Falangists were concentrated at local government and grassroot level, entrusted with harnessing the Civil War's momentum of mass mobilisation through their auxiliaries and trade unions by collecting denunciations of enemy residents and recruiting workers into the trade unions. While there were prominent Falangists at a senior government level, especially before the late 1940s, there were higher concentrations of monarchists, military officials and other traditional conservative factions at those levels. However, the Falange remained the sole party.

The Francoists took control of Spain through a comprehensive and methodical war of attrition (guerra de desgaste) which involved the imprisonment and executions of Spaniards suspected of supporting the values promoted by the Republic: regional autonomy, liberal or social democracy, free elections, socialist leanings, women's rights, and voting rights. The right-wing considered these "enemy elements" to comprise an "anti-Spain" that was the product of Bolsheviks and a "Judeo-Masonic conspiracy". The latter allegation pre-dated Falangism, having evolved after the Reconquista of the Iberian Peninsula from the Islamic Moors. Falangist founder, Jose Antonio Primo de Rivera, had a more tolerant position than the Nazis in Germany, as the small size of the Jewish community in Spain at the time did not favor the development of strong antisemitism. Primo de Rivera saw the solution to the "Jewish problem" in Spain as simple: the conversion of the Jews to Catholicism. At the end of the Spanish Civil War, according to the regime's own figures there were more than  men and women held in prisons and some  had fled into exile. Large numbers of those captured were returned to Spain or interned in Nazi concentration camps as stateless enemies. Between six and seven thousand exiles from Spain died in Mauthausen. It has been estimated that more than  Spaniards died in the first years of the dictatorship from 1940 to 1942 as a result of execution or hunger and disease related to the conflict.

Spain's strong ties with the Axis resulted in its international ostracism in the early years following World War II. Spain was not a founding member of the United Nations and did not become a member until 1955. This changed as the Cold War went on, and Franco's strong anti-communism naturally tilted its regime to ally with the United States. Independent political parties and trade unions were banned for the duration of the dictatorship. Nevertheless, once decrees for economic stabilisation were put forth by the late 1950s, the way was opened for massive foreign investment—"a watershed in post-war economic, social and ideological normalisation leading to extraordinarily rapid economic growth"—that marked Spain's "participation in the Europe-wide post-war economic normality centred on mass consumption and consensus, in contrast to the concurrent reality of the Soviet bloc".

On 26 July 1947, Spain was declared a kingdom, but no monarch was designated until in 1969 Franco established Juan Carlos of Bourbon as his official heir-apparent. Franco was to be succeeded by Luis Carrero Blanco as Prime Minister with the intention of continuing the Francoist regime, but those hopes ended with his 1973 assassination by the Basque separatist group ETA. With the death of Franco on 20 November 1975, Juan Carlos became the King of Spain. He initiated the country's subsequent transition to democracy, ending with Spain becoming a constitutional monarchy with an elected parliament and autonomous devolved governments.

Government

After Franco's victory in 1939, the Falange was declared the sole legally sanctioned political party in Spain and it asserted itself as the main component of the National Movement. In a state of emergency-like status, Franco ruled with, on paper, more power than any Spanish leader before or since. He was not even required to consult his cabinet for most legislation. According to historian Stanley G. Payne, Franco had more day-to-day power than Adolf Hitler or Joseph Stalin possessed at the respective heights of their power. Payne noted that Hitler and Stalin at least maintained rubber-stamp parliaments, while Franco dispensed with even that formality in the early years of his rule. According to Payne, the lack of even a rubber-stamp parliament made Franco's government "the most purely arbitrary in the world." The 100-member National Council of the Movement served as a makeshift legislature until the passing of the organic law of 1942 and the Ley Constitutiva de las Cortes (Constituent Law of the Cortes) the same year, which saw the grand opening of the Cortes Españolas on 18 July 1942.

The Organic Law made the executive government ultimately responsible for passing all laws, while defining the Cortes as a purely advisory body elected by neither direct nor universal suffrage. The Cortes had no power over government spending, and the government was not responsible for it; ministers were appointed and dismissed by Franco alone as the "Chief" of state and government. The Ley del Referendum Nacional (Law of the National Referendum), passed in 1945 approved for all "fundamental laws" to be approved by a popular referendum, in which only the heads of families could vote. Local municipal councils were appointed similarly by heads of families and local corporations through local municipal elections while mayors were appointed by the government. It was thus one of the most centralised countries in Europe and certainly the most centralised in Western Europe following the fall of the Portuguese Estado Novo in the Carnation Revolution.

The referendum law was used twice during Franco's rule—in 1947, when a referendum revived the Spanish monarchy with Franco as de facto regent for life with sole right to appoint his successor; and in 1966, another referendum was held to approve a new "organic law", or constitution, supposedly limiting and clearly defining Franco's powers as well as formally creating the modern office of Prime Minister of Spain. By delaying the issue of republic versus monarchy for his 36-year dictatorship and by refusing to take up the throne himself in 1947, Franco sought to antagonise neither the monarchical Carlists (who preferred the restoration of a Bourbon) nor the republican "old shirts" (original Falangists). Franco ignored the claim to the throne of Infante Juan, Count of Barcelona, son of the last king, Alfonso XIII, who designated himself as his heir; Franco found him too liberal. In 1961, Franco offered Otto von Habsburg the throne, but was refused and ultimately followed Otto's recommendation by selecting in 1969 the young Juan Carlos of Bourbon, son of Infante Juan, as his officially designated heir to the throne, shortly after his 30th birthday (the minimum age required under the Law of Succession).

In 1973, due to old age and to lessen his burdens in governing Spain, Franco resigned as Prime Minister and named Navy Admiral Luis Carrero Blanco to the said post, but he remained as the Chief of State, Commander-in-Chief of the Armed Forces and Jefe del Movimiento (Chief of the Movement). Carrero Blanco was assassinated in the same year and Carlos Arias Navarro became the country's new Prime Minister.

Armed forces

Concerns about the international situation, Spain's possible entry into World War II, and threats of invasion led him to undo some of these reductions. In November 1942, with the Allied landings in North Africa and the German occupation of France bringing hostilities closer than ever to Spain's border, Franco ordered a partial mobilization, bringing the army to over  men. The Air Force and Navy also grew in numbers and in budgets to  airmen and  sailors by 1945, although for fiscal reasons Franco had to restrain attempts by both services to undertake dramatic expansions. The army maintained a strength of about  men until the end of the Second World War.

Colonial empire and decolonisation

Spain attempted to retain control of the last remnants of its colonial empire throughout Franco's rule. During the Algerian War (1954–1962), Madrid became the base of the Organisation armée secrète right-wing French Army group which sought to preserve French Algeria. Despite this, Franco was forced to make some concessions. When the French protectorate in Morocco became independent in 1956, Spain surrendered its Spanish protectorate in Morocco to Mohammed V, retaining only a few exclaves, the Plazas de soberanía. The year after, Mohammed V invaded Spanish Sahara during the Ifni War (known as the "Forgotten War" in Spain). Only in 1975, with the Green March and the military occupation, did Morocco take control of all of the former Spanish territories in the Sahara.

In 1968, under United Nations pressure, Franco granted Spain's colony of Equatorial Guinea its independence and the next year ceded the exclave of Ifni to Morocco. Under Franco, Spain also pursued a campaign to gain sovereignty of the British overseas territory of Gibraltar and closed its border in 1969. The border would not be fully reopened until 1985.

Francoism

Initially the regime embraced the definition of "Totalitarian State" or the "nacional-sindicalista" label. Following the defeat of Fascism in WW2,  was the new moniker the regime adopted for itself, yet it only sounded credible to staunch believers. Other later soft definitions include "authoritarian regime" or "constituent or developmental dictatorship", the latter having inner backing from within the regime. During Cold War, Juan José Linz, either accused of whitewashing the regime or being praised as the elaborator of "the first scientific conceptualization" of the regime, famously early characterized it as an "authoritarian regime with limited pluralism". The Francoist regime has been described by other scholars as a "Fascismo a la española" ("Spanish-style Fascism") or as a specific variant of Fascism marked by the preponderance of the Catholic Church, the Armed Forces and Traditionalism.

While the regime evolved along with its protracted history, the primitive essence of it remained, underpinned by the legal concentration of all powers into a single person, Francisco Franco, "Caudillo of Spain by the Grace of God", embodying national sovereignty and "only responsible before God and History.

The consistent points in Francoism included above all authoritarianism, anti-Communism, Spanish nationalism, national Catholicism, monarchism, militarism, national conservatism, anti-Masonry, anti-Catalanism, pan-Hispanism, and anti-liberalism—some authors also include integralism. Stanley Payne, a scholar of Spain notes that "scarcely any of the serious historians and analysts of Franco consider the generalissimo to be a core fascist". According to historian Walter Laqueur "during the Civil War, Spanish fascists were forced to subordinate their activities to the nationalist cause. At the helm were military leaders such as General Francisco Franco, who were conservatives in all essential respects. When the civil war ended, Franco was so deeply entrenched that the Falange stood no chance; in this strongly authoritarian regime, there was no room for political opposition. The Falange became junior partners in the government and, as such, they had to accept responsibility for the regime's policy without being able to shape it substantially". The United Nations Security Council voted in 1946 to deny the Franco regime recognition until it developed a more representative government.

Development
The Falange Española de las JONS, a fascist party formed during the Republic, soon transformed itself into the framework of reference in the National Movement. In April 1937, the Falange Española Tradicionalista y de las Juntas de Ofensiva Nacional Sindicalista (Traditionalist Spanish Phalanx and of the Councils of National Syndicalist Offensive) was created from the absorption of the Comunión Tradicionalista (Traditionalist Communion) by the Falange Española de las Juntas de Ofensiva Nacional Sindicalista, which itself was the result of an earlier absorption of the Juntas de Ofensiva Nacional-Sindicalista by José Antonio Primo de Rivera's Falange Española. This party, often referred to as Falange, became the sole legal party during Franco's regime, but the term "party" was generally avoided, especially after World War II, when it was commonly referred to as the "National Movement" or just as "the Movement".

Fascism and authoritarianism
The main point of those scholars that tend to consider the Spanish State to be authoritarian rather than fascist is that the FET-JONS were relatively heterogeneous rather than being an ideological monolith. After World War II, the Falange opposed free capital markets, but the ultimately prevailing technocrats, some of them linked with Opus Dei, eschewed syndicalist economics and favoured increased competition as a means of achieving rapid economic growth and integration with wider Europe.

The Spanish State was authoritarian: Non-government trade unions and all political opponents across the political spectrum were either suppressed or controlled by all means, including police repression. Most country towns and rural areas were patrolled by pairs of Guardia Civil, a military police for civilians, which functioned as a chief means of social control. Larger cities, and capitals, were mostly under the heavily armed Policía Armada, commonly called grises due to their grey uniforms. Franco was also the focus of a personality cult, which taught that he had been sent by Divine Providence to save the country from chaos and poverty.

Members of the oppressed ranged from Catholic trade unions to communist and anarchist organisations to liberal democrats and Catalan or Basque separatists. The Confederación Nacional del Trabajo (CNT) and the Unión General de Trabajadores (UGT) trade unions were outlawed and replaced in 1940 by the corporatist Sindicato Vertical. The Spanish Socialist Workers' Party (PSOE) and the Esquerra Republicana de Catalunya (ERC) party were banned in 1939 while the Communist Party of Spain (PCE) went underground. University students seeking democracy revolted in the late 1960s and early 1970s, which was repressed by the grises. The Basque Nationalist Party (PNV) went into exile and in 1959 the armed separatist group ETA was created to wage a low-intensity war against Franco. Like others at the time, Franco evinced a concern about a possible Masonic and Judaic conspiracy against his regime.

Franco continued to personally sign all death warrants until just months before he died despite international campaigns requesting him to desist.

Spanish nationalism

Franco's Spanish nationalism promoted a Castilian-centric unitary national identity by repressing Spain's cultural diversity. Bullfighting and flamenco were promoted as national traditions, while those traditions not considered Spanish were suppressed. Franco's view of Spanish tradition was somewhat artificial and arbitrary: while some regional traditions were suppressed, Flamenco, an Andalusian rather than Castilian tradition, was considered part of a larger, national identity. All cultural activities were subject to censorship and many were forbidden entirely, often in an erratic manner. This cultural policy relaxed over time, most notably in the late 1960s and early 1970s.

Franco was reluctant to enact any form of administrative and legislative decentralisation and kept a fully centralised form of government with a similar administrative structure to that established by the House of Bourbon and General Miguel Primo de Rivera. These structures were modelled after the centralised French state. As a result of this type of governance, government attention and initiatives were irregular and often depended more on the goodwill of government representatives than on regional needs. Thus inequalities in schooling, health care or transport facilities among regions were patent: historically affluent regions like Madrid, Catalonia or the Basque Country fared much better than others such as Extremadura, Galicia or Andalusia.

Franco eliminated the autonomy granted by the Second Spanish Republic to the regions and abolished the centuries-old fiscal privileges and autonomy (the fueros) in two of the three Basque provinces: Guipuzcoa and Biscay, which were officially classified as "traitor regions". The fueros were kept in the third Basque province, Alava, and also in Navarre, a former kingdom during the Middle Ages and the cradle of the Carlists, possibly due to the region's support during the Civil War.

Franco also used language politics in an attempt to establish national homogeneity. Despite Franco himself being Galician, the government revoked the official statute and recognition for the Basque, Galician and Catalan languages that the Republic had granted them for the first time in the history of Spain. The former policy of promoting Spanish as the only official language of the state and education was resumed, even though millions of the country's citizens spoke other languages. The legal usage of languages other than Spanish was forbidden: all government, notarial, legal and commercial documents were to be drawn up exclusively in Spanish and any written in other languages were deemed null and void. The use of any other language was forbidden in schools, advertising, religious ceremonies and on-road and shop signs. Publications in other languages were generally forbidden, though citizens continued to use them privately. During the late 1960s, these policies became more lenient yet non-Castilian languages continued to be discouraged and did not receive official status or legal recognition. Additionally, the popularisation of the compulsory national educational system and the development of modern mass media, both controlled by the state and exclusively in Spanish, reduced the competency of speakers of Basque, Catalan and Galician.

Roman Catholicism
Franco's regime often used religion as a means to increase its popularity throughout the Catholic world, especially after the Second World War. Franco himself was increasingly portrayed as a fervent Catholic and a staunch defender of Roman Catholicism, the declared state religion. The regime favoured very conservative Roman Catholicism and it reversed the secularisation process that had taken place under the Republic. According to historian Julian Casanova, "the symbiosis of religion, fatherland and Caudillo" saw the Church assume great political responsibilities, "a hegemony and monopoly beyond its wildest dreams" and it played "a central role in policing the country's citizens".

The Law of Political Responsibility of February 1939 turned the Church into an extralegal body of investigation as parishes were granted policing powers equal to those of local government officials and leaders of the Falange. Some official jobs required a "good behaviour" statement by a priest. According to historian Julian Casanova, "the reports that have survived reveal a clergy that was bitter because of the violent anti-clericalism and the unacceptable level of secularisation that Spanish society had reached during the republican years" and the law of 1939 made the priests investigators of peoples' ideological and political pasts.

The authorities encouraged denunciations in the workplace. For example, Barcelona's city hall obliged all government functionaries to "tell the proper authorities who the leftists are in your department and everything you know about their activities". A law passed in 1939 institutionalised the purging of public offices. The poet Carlos Barral recorded that in his family "any allusion to republican relatives was scrupulously avoided; everyone took part in the enthusiasm for the new era and wrapped themselves in the folds of religiosity". Only through silence could people associated with the Republic be relatively safe from imprisonment or unemployment. After the death of Franco, the price of the peaceful transition to democracy would be silence and "the tacit agreement to forget the past", which was given legal status by the 1977 Pact of forgetting.

Civil marriages that had taken place in the Republic were declared null and void unless they had been validated by the Church, along with divorces. Divorce, contraception and abortions were forbidden. Children had to be given Christian names. Franco was made a member of the Supreme Order of Christ by Pope Pius XII whilst Spain itself was consecrated to the Sacred Heart.

The Catholic Church's ties with the Franco dictatorship gave it control over the country's schools and crucifixes were once again placed in schoolrooms. After the war, Franco chose José Ibáñez Martín, a member of the National Catholic Association of Propagandists, to lead the Ministry of Education. He held the post for 12 years, during which he finished the task of purging the ministry begun by the Commission of Culture and Teaching headed by José María Pemán. Pemán led the work of Catholicizing state-sponsored schools and allocating generous funding to the Church's schools. Romualdo de Toledo, head of the National Service of Primary Education, was a traditionalist who described the model school as "the monastery founded by Saint Benedict". The clergy in charge of the education system sanctioned and sacked thousands of teachers of the progressive left and divided Spain's schools up among the families of falangists, loyalist soldiers and Catholic families. In some provinces, like Lugo, practically all the teachers were dismissed. This process also affected tertiary education, as Ibáñez Martín, Catholic propagandists and the Opus Dei ensured professorships were offered only to the most faithful.

The orphaned children of "Reds" were taught in orphanages run by priests and nuns that "their parents had committed great sins that they could help expiate, for which many were incited to serve the Church".

Francoism professed a strong devotion to militarism, hypermasculinity and the traditional role of women in society. A woman was to be loving to her parents and brothers, faithful to her husband and to reside with her family. Official propaganda confined women's roles to family care and motherhood. Most progressive laws passed by the Second Republic were declared void. Women could not become judges, or testify in the trial. They could not become university professors. In the 1960s and 1970s, there was increasing liberalization, yet such measures would continue until Franco's death.

In 1947, Franco proclaimed Spain a monarchy through the Ley de Sucesión en la Jefatura del Estado act, but did not designate a monarch. He had no particular desire for a king because of his strained relations with the legitimist heir to the Crown, Juan of Bourbon. Therefore, he left the throne vacant with himself as regent and set the basis for his succession. This gesture was largely done to appease monarchist factions within the Movement. At the same time, Franco wore the uniform of a captain-general (a rank traditionally reserved for the King), resided in the Royal Palace of El Pardo, appropriated the kingly privilege of walking beneath a canopy and his portrait appeared on most Spanish coins. Indeed, although his formal titles were Jefe del Estado (Head of State) and Generalísimo de los Ejércitos Españoles (Generalissimo of the Spanish Armies), he was referred to as Caudillo of Spain, by the Grace of God. Por la Gracia de Dios is a technical, legal formulation which states sovereign dignity in absolute monarchies and had been used only by monarchs before.

The long-delayed selection of Juan Carlos of Bourbon as Franco's official successor in 1969 was an unpleasant surprise for many interested parties as Juan Carlos was the rightful heir for neither the Carlists nor the Legitimists.

Women in Francoist Spain 

Women had first been granted the right to vote in Spain during the Second Republic. Under the new constitution they had gained full legal status and equal access to the labor market, abortion had been legalized and the crime of adultery abolished.

The Franco regime's embrace of National Catholicism (nacionalcatolicismo) as part of its ideological identity meant that the Catholic Church, which traditionally supported the social subordination of women, had preeminence in all aspects of public and private life in Spain. The Catholic Church had a central role in upholding the traditional role of the family and women's place in it. Civil marriage had also been introduced in the country during the Republic, so the Church immediately asked the new Franco regime to restore its control of family and marriage laws. All Spanish women were required by the state to serve for six months in the Women's Section (Sección Femenina), the female branch of the Falange state party, to undergo training for motherhood along with political indoctrination.

Francoism professed a devotion to the traditional role of a woman in society; that is, being a loving daughter and sister to her parents and brothers, being a faithful wife to her husband, and residing with her family. Official propaganda confined the role of women to family care and motherhood. Immediately after the civil war most progressive laws passed by the Republic aimed at equality between the sexes were nullified. Women could not become judges or testify in a trial. Their affairs and economic lives had to be managed by their fathers and husbands. Until the 1970s, a woman could not open a bank account without having it co-signed by her father or husband. In the 1960s and 1970s these restrictions were somewhat relaxed.

Francoist influence in Chile
Francoism had an influence abroad in Chile, where it clearly inspired the military dictatorship era (1973–1990), in particular in its early period prior to 1980. Traditionalist historian Jaime Eyzaguirre was an admirer of Francoist Spain. The lawyer Jaime Guzmán, once a student of Eyzaguirre, helped establishing the Francoist-influenced Guildist Movement at the Pontifical Catholic University of Chile in the 1960s. This has been interpreted as a reaction inspired in Francoist corporatism against elements of the Chilean university reform. The movement rapidly gained a long-lasting influence in the catholic universities of Chile. The Guildists, presenting themselves as apolitical, were highly critical of perceived detrimental ideological influences in the Church, corporations (e.g. trade unions) and the Christian Democratic Party.

Already in from the first days of after the 1973 Chilean coup d'état Guzmán became advisor and speechwriter of dictator Augusto Pinochet. While writing the Constitution of Chile of 1980 Jaime Guzmán studied the institutionalization of Francoism in Spain with the aim of preventing undesired reforms in future as it happened in Spain with the post-Franco constitution of 1977. Josemaría Escrivá, the founder of Opus Dei, visited Chile 1974 after which Opus Dei begun to spread in the country. Opus Dei helped establish the University of the Andes in 1989. Both the University of the Andes and the political party Independent Democratic Union, founded in 1983 by Guzmán, have a Francoist heritage. In the 1970s Pinochet's dictatorship organized ritualized acts reminiscent of Francoist Spain, notably Acto de Chacarillas. After 1980, Francoist influence gave way to economic liberalism. Even Guzmán, once clearly influenced by Francoist corporatism, adopted economic liberalism from the Chicago Boys and writings such as The Spirit of Democratic Capitalism.

In 1975 Pinochet and his wife Lucía Hiriart attended the funeral of Francisco Franco. When Pinochet died in 2006 supporters of late Francisco Franco paid homage in Spain. Antonio Tejero, who led the failed coup of 1981, attended a memorial service in Madrid.

Narrative of the Civil War

For nearly twenty years after the war, Francoist Spain presented the conflict as a crusade against Bolshevism in defence of Christian civilization. In Francoist narrative, the "good authority" had defeated "anarchy" and overseen the elimination of agitators, those without God and the "Judeo-Masonic conspiracy". Since Franco had relied on thousands of North African soldiers, anti-Islamic sentiment "was played down but the centuries-old myth of the Moorish threat lay at the base of the construction of the "communist menace" as a modern-day Eastern plague". The official position was therefore that the wartime Republic was simply a proto-Stalinist monolith, its leaders intent on creating a Spanish Soviet satellite. Many Spanish children grew up believing the war was fought against foreigners and the painter Julian Grau Santos has said "it was instilled in me and I always believed that Spain had won the war against foreign enemies of our historic greatness". About  Catholic clergy were murdered by the Republicans. Collectively, they are known as the martyrs of the Spanish Civil War.

Media
Under the 1938 Press Law, all newspapers were put under prior censorship and were forced to include any articles the government desired. Chief editors were nominated by the government and all journalists were required to be registered. All liberal, republican and left-wing media were prohibited.

The Delegación Nacional de Prensa y Propaganda was established as a network of government media, including daily newspapers Diario Arriba and Pueblo. The EFE and Pyresa government news agencies were created in 1939 and 1945. The Radio Nacional de España state radio had the exclusive right to transmit news bulletins, which all broadcasters were required to air. The No-Do were 10-minute newsreels shown at all cinemas. The Televisión Española, the government television network, debuted in 1956.

The Roman Catholic Church had its own media outlets, including the Ya newspaper and the Cadena COPE radio network. Other pro-government media included Cadena SER, ABC, La Vanguardia Española, El Correo and El Diario Vasco.

Notable independent media outlets included humour magazine La Codorniz.

The 1966 Press Law dropped the prior censorship regime and allowed media outlets to select their own directors, although criticism was still a crime.

Economic policy

The Civil War had ravaged the Spanish economy. Infrastructure had been damaged, workers killed and daily business severely hampered. For more than a decade after Franco's victory, the economy improved little. Franco initially pursued a policy of autarky, cutting off almost all international trade. The policy had devastating effects and the economy stagnated. Only black marketeers could enjoy an evident affluence.

In 1940, the Sindicato Vertical was created. It was inspired by the ideas of José Antonio Primo de Rivera, who thought that class struggle would be ended by grouping together workers and owners according to corporative principles. It was the only legal trade union and was under government control. Other trade unions were forbidden and strongly repressed along with political parties outside the Falange.

The Francoist agrarian colonisation was one of the most ambitious programs related to the regime's agrarian policies, which were an answer to the Republic's Law of Agrarian Reform and the war-time collectivizations. Somewhat inspired by the brief points related to agrarian policy of FE de las JONS, the Francoist colonisation underpinned a materialisation of the agrarian policies vowed by Fascism (connected to the Italian Bonifica integrale or the agrarian policy elements of the Nazi Generalplan Ost). The policy was carried out by the Instituto Nacional de Colonización (INC), created in 1939 with the goal of agricultural modernisation by means of the creation of irrigated lands, improvements in agrarian technology and training and the installment of settlers. By means of the INC, the extension and enforcement of internal colonization laws became a priority in the country. The enforced policies consolidated the privileges of the landowning classes, protecting to a large extent the large landowners from potential expropriations (tierras reservadas where large landowners owners retained land property and were transformed into irrigated lands with help from the INC vs the comparatively smaller tierras en exceso, purchased or expropriated and where settlers installed). While its inception dates to the period of hegemony of Fascist powers in Europe, the plan did not fully take off until the 1950s. From 1940 to 1970 around 300 colonisation settlements were created.

On the brink of bankruptcy, a combination of pressure from the United States (including about $1.5 billion in aid 1954–1964), the IMF and technocrats from Opus Dei managed to "convince" the regime to liberalize the economy in 1959 in what amounted to a mini coup d'état which removed the old guard in charge of the economy, despite the opposition of Franco. However, this economic liberalisation was not accompanied by political reforms and oppression continued unabated.

Economic growth picked up after 1959 after Franco took authority away from these ideologues and gave more power to the liberal technocrats. The country implemented several development policies and growth took off, creating the "Spanish Miracle". Concurrent with the absence of social reforms and the economic power shift, a tide of mass emigration commenced to European countries and to lesser extent to South America. Emigration helped the regime in two ways: the country got rid of surplus population and the emigrants supplied the country with much needed monetary remittances.

During the 1960s, Spain experienced further increases in wealth. International firms established their factories in Spain. Spain became the second-fastest-growing economy in the world, alongside Brazil and just behind Japan. The rapid development of this period became known as the "Spanish Miracle". At the time of Franco's death, Spain still lagged behind most of Western Europe, but the gap between its GDP per capita and that of the major Western European economies had greatly narrowed. In world terms, Spain was already enjoying a fairly high material standard of living with basic but comprehensive services. However, the period between the mid-1970s and mid-1980s was to prove difficult as in addition to the oil shocks to which Spain was highly exposed, the settling of the new political order took priority over the modernising of the economy.

Legacy

In Spain and abroad, the legacy of Franco remains controversial. In Germany, a squadron named after Werner Mölders has been renamed because as a pilot he led the escorting units in the bombing of Guernica. As recently as 2006, the BBC reported that Maciej Giertych, an MEP of the right-wing League of Polish Families, had expressed admiration for Franco's stature who he believed had "guaranteed the maintenance of traditional values in Europe".

Spanish opinion has changed. Most statues of Franco and other public Francoist symbols have been removed, with the last statue in Madrid coming down in 2005. Additionally, the Permanent Commission of the European Parliament "firmly" condemned in a resolution unanimously adopted in March 2006 the "multiple and serious violations" of human rights committed in Spain under the Francoist regime from 1939 to 1975. The resolution was at the initiative of the MEP Leo Brincat and of the historian Luis María de Puig and is the first international official condemnation of the repression enacted by Franco's regime. The resolution also urged to provide public access to historians (professional and amateurs) to the various archives of the Francoist regime, including those of the Fundación Francisco Franco, which as well as other Francoist archives remain as of 2006 inaccessible to the public. Furthermore, it urged the Spanish authorities to set up an underground exhibition in the Valley of the Fallen in order to explain the terrible conditions in which it was built. Finally, it proposed the construction of monuments to commemorate Franco's victims in Madrid and other important cities.

In Spain, a commission to restore the dignity of the victims of Franco's regime and pay tribute to their memory (comisión para reparar la dignidad y restituir la memoria de las víctimas del franquismo) was approved in the summer of 2004 and was directed by the then-Vice President María Teresa Fernández de la Vega. Because of his repressive regional linguistic policies, Franco's memory is still particularly resented in Catalonia and the Basque Country. The Basque Provinces and Catalonia were among the regions that offered the strongest resistance to Franco in the Civil War, as well as during his regime.

In 2008, the Association for the Recovery of Historical Memory initiated a systematic search for mass graves of people executed during Franco's regime, a move supported since the Spanish Socialist Workers' Party's victory during the 2004 elections by José Luis Rodríguez Zapatero's government. The Historical Memory Law (Ley de Memoria Histórica) was passed in 2007 as an attempt to enforce official recognition of the crimes committed against civilians during Franco's rule and to organise under state supervision the search for mass graves.

Investigations have begun into wide-scale child abduction during the Franco years. The lost children of Francoism may reach 300,000.

Flags and heraldry

Flags

At the conclusion of the Spanish Civil War and in spite of the army's reorganisation, several sections of the army continued with their bi-colour flags improvised in 1936, but since 1940 new ensigns began to be distributed, whose main innovation was the addition of the eagle of Saint John to the shield. The new arms were allegedly inspired in the coat of arms the Catholic Monarchs adopted after the taking of Emirate of Granada from the Moors, but replacing the arms of Sicily with those of Navarre and adding the Pillars of Hercules on either side of the coat of arms. In 1938, the columns were placed outside the wings. On 26 July 1945, the commander's ensigns were suppressed by decree and on 11 October a detailed regulation of flags was published that fixed the model of the bi-colour flag in use, but better defined its details, emphasising a greater style of the Saint John's eagle. The models established by this decree remained in force until 1977.

During this period, two more flags were usually displayed along with the national flag: the flag of Falange (red, black and red vertical stripes, with the yokes and arrows in the centre of the black stripe) and the traditionalist flag (white background with the Cross of Burgundy in the middle), representing the National Movement which had unified Falange and the Requetés under the name Falange Española Tradicionalista y de las JONS.

From the death of Franco in 1975 until 1977, the national flag followed the 1945 regulations. On 21 January 1977, a new regulation was approved that stipulated an eagle with more open wings, with the restored Pillars of Hercules placed within the wings and the tape with the motto "Una, Grande y Libre" ("One, Great and Free") moved over the eagle's head from its previous position around the neck.

Standards

From 1940 to 1975, Franco used the Royal Bend of Castile as Head of State's standard and guidon: the Bend between the Pillars of Hercules, crowned with an imperial crown and open royal crown.

As Prince of Spain from 1969 to 1975, Juan Carlos used a royal standard which was virtually identical to the one later adopted when he became King in 1975. The earlier standard differed only that it featured the royal crown of a Crown Prince, the King's royal crown has 8 arches of which 5 are visible, while the Prince's one has only 4 arches of which 3 are visible. The Royal Standard of Spain consists of a dark blue square with the coat of arms in the centre. The King's guidon is identical to the standard.

Coat of arms

In 1938, Franco adopted a variant of the coat of arms reinstating some elements originally used by the House of Trastámara such as Saint John's eagle and the yoke and arrows as follows: "Quarterly, 1 and 4. quarterly Castile and León, 2 and 3. per pale Aragon and Navarra, enté en point of Granada. The arms are crowned with an open royal crown, placed on eagle displayed sable, surrounded with the pillars of Hercules, the yoke and the bundle of arrows of the Catholic Monarchs".

See also

 Art and culture in Francoist Spain
 European interwar dictatorships
 Francoist Catalonia
 Francoist concentration camps
 Instituto Nacional de Colonización
 Language policies of Francoist Spain
 List of people executed by Francoist Spain
 Nationalist foreign volunteers
 Pact of forgetting
 Sociological Francoism
 White Terror (Spain)

Notes

References

Sources 

 
 
 Gerald Brenan, The Face of Spain, (London: Serif, 2010). First-hand account of travels around Spain in 1949. 
 Payne, S. (1987). The Franco Regime (1st ed.). Madison, WI: University of Wisconsin Press. 
 Luis Fernandez. Franco. Editorial.

External links
 
 , the Spanish Constitution under Franco. 
 

 
20th century in Spain
Francoism
Catholicism and far-right politics
Modern history of Spain
Former monarchies of Europe
States and territories established in 1939
States and territories disestablished in 1975
1936 establishments in Spain
1975 disestablishments in Spain
Spain
Francisco Franco
Military dictatorships
Totalitarian states